Arturo Hortal (born 1900, date of death unknown) was an Argentine tennis player. He competed in the men's singles event at the 1924 Summer Olympics.

References

External links
 

1900 births
Year of death missing
Argentine male tennis players
Olympic tennis players of Argentina
Tennis players at the 1924 Summer Olympics
Place of birth missing